Monument is a best of album by Norwegian rock band Seigmen.

Track listing 
 "Malmklang" - 4:14
 "Universal (remix)" - 3:33
 "Mørkets øy" - 4:25
 "The Modern End" - 4:25
 "Slaver av solen" - 4:25
 "Metropolis" - 5:27
 "Dråben" - 3:57
 "Ohm" - 5:33
 "In Limbo" - 5:40
 "Döderlein" - 4:33
 "Hjernen er alene" - 6:35
 "Mesusah" - 8:59
 "Fra x til døden" - 6:58
 "Frost-Bite" - 6:08

Personnel 
Alex Møklebust - Lead vocals
Kim Ljung - Bass guitar, vocals
Noralf Ronthi - drums
Marius Roth Christensen - Electric guitar
Sverre Økshoff - Electric guitar

Seigmen albums
1999 compilation albums